This is a list of Web testing tools, giving a general overview in terms of features, sometimes used for Web scraping.

Main features 
Web testing tools may be classified based on different prerequisites that a user may require to test web applications mainly scripting requirements, GUI functionalities and browser compatibility.

See also 

 List of GUI testing tools

References

External links 
 Web Site Test Tools and Site Management Tools
 Open Source Web Testing Tools in Java
 OWASP list of Testing Tools

Web Testing Tools